Ranunculus biternatus, the Antarctic buttercup, is a plant in the buttercup family Ranunculaceae. It is native to southern South America and some subantarctic islands.

Description

Ranunculus biternatus grows as a forb. The flowers are yellow. The red or purple fruits resemble raspberries and are edible.

Distribution and habitat
Ranunculus biternatus is native to Patagonia, the Falkland Islands and a number of subantarctic islands. The species is common in or near wet areas such as bogs, pools and streams, from sea level to  altitude.

References

biternatus
Flora of southern Chile
Flora of South Argentina
Flora of the subantarctic islands
Plants described in 1815
Taxa named by James Edward Smith